Ismael Rivera (born 7 July 1951) is a Puerto Rican archer. He competed in the men's individual event at the 1984 Summer Olympics.

References

1951 births
Living people
Puerto Rican male archers
Olympic archers of Puerto Rico
Archers at the 1984 Summer Olympics
Place of birth missing (living people)